Edward William "Eddie" Ewasiuk (September 24, 1933 – April 14, 2006) was a labour activist, a city councilor in Edmonton, Alberta and a NDP Member of the Legislative Assembly in the Legislative Assembly of Alberta. He was born in Vegreville, Alberta.

Early life
Ed W. Ewasiuk was born on September 24, 1933 in Vegreville, Alberta. He was born to parents of Ukrainian descent. Ewasiuk was a labour activist with what was the Oil, Chemical and Atomic Workers Union. He served as a president of his local and then as a national vice-president. In 1980, he ran for city council in Edmonton's Northeast Ward 3 as part of the now-defunct Edmonton Voters' Association municipal party. and won, and was re-elected in 1983.

Provincial politics
In the 1986 Alberta general election, Ewasiuk stood for MLA as a New Democrat in the northeast riding of Edmonton-Beverly. He won easily, garnering almost 60% of the vote, in an NDP sweep of Edmonton under Ray Martin's leadership. He defeated powerful PC Cabinet minister Bill Diachuk.

In City Hall and Legislature, Ewasiuk gained a reputation as a devout advocate of workers' rights and reducing poverty.

In the 1989 Alberta general election, Ewasiuk was re-elected with 50% of the vote. He was defeated in the 1993 Alberta general election by Julius Yankowsky in the new electoral district of Edmonton-Beverly-Belmont after his old electoral district of Edmonton-Beverly was redistributed.

Late life and legacy
Ewasiuk died suddenly at his home in Edmonton in 2006. In 2007, a memorial bench for Ewasiuk was unveiled by the NDP and the CEP union facing Edmonton City Hall.

References

External links
Legislative Assembly of Alberta Members Listing

1933 births
2006 deaths
Alberta New Democratic Party MLAs
Canadian people of Ukrainian descent
Canadian socialists of Ukrainian descent
Canadian socialists
Canadian trade unionists
Edmonton city councillors
People from Vegreville